Summary of Evidence may refer to:

Summary of Evidence (CSRT), a 2004 memo about the Guantanamo Bay detention camp
Summary of Evidence (ARB), a 2005 memo about the Guantanamo Bay detention camp